Gabungan Rakyat Sabah (abbrev:GRS), also officially known as the Gabungan Rakyat Sabah Party or for shorts GRS Party is an official registered political coalition and also a single entity political party in Sabah, Malaysia. Datuk Seri Panglima Hajiji Noor is the founder and the inaugural chairman holder of this registered political coalition. At the state level, Gabungan Rakyat Sabah is a coalition of parties with the same formula as Gabungan Parti Sarawak (GPS) which promotes unity between the president of the local party and the local people.

This political coalition is also registered with its constitution that allow Independent politician to join directly without component party and become GRS direct members. The strongholds of the GRS party in terms of people's support are the interior of Sabah, the east coast of Sabah and half of the west coast of Sabah. Since 2020, this coalition is currently the ruling coalition in Sabah.

This political coalition  was registered and legalised on 11 March 2022, under Societies Act 1966.

Originally founded as an informal alliance, upon registration it currently consists of five Sabah parties and also registered with constitution that allows independent politician to become coalition direct members. The component parties of GRS are the Parti Gagasan Rakyat Sabah (GAGASAN), Homeland Solidarity Party (STAR), United Sabah Party (PBS), Sabah Progressive Party (SAPP), and United Sabah National Organisation (USNO Baru) plus GRS direct members (independent politician).

With the support of the national ruling coalition Barisan Nasional, the Social Democratic Harmony Party and an independent in the state legislature, GRS is currently the ruling party of Sabah after securing a simple majority in the 2020 state elections.

In 2022, this coalition officially only combines the former components of Gabungan Bersatu Sabah (GBS), United Borneo Alliance (UBA), and former independent politicians. Such things cause GRS to be seen as a fully local political coalition party entity without the interference of parties outside Sabah.

The coalition is the second local coalition in Sabah to be officially approved by the Department of Registration of Societies Malaysia (RoS). The Pasok-PBS coalition was the first Sabah coalition to be registered under the Societies Act 1966. However, the Pasok-PBS coalition was dissolved after a split in the Sabah United Party in 1994.

However, Barisan Nasional has withdrawn support for GRS as of 6 January 2023 and back to support for GRS as of 12 February 2023.

History

The rise to power of GRS Alliance Party

On 12 September 2020, Hajiji Noor established an informal alliance, the Gabungan Rakyat Sabah (GRS) to compete against Shafie Apdal's ruling Warisan Plus coalition consisting of Parti Warisan Sabah, the Democratic Action Party, Parti Keadilan Rakyat, and the United Progressive Kinabalu Organisation during the 2020 Sabah state election. The GRS alliance consisted of Muhyiddin's Perikatan Nasional coalition, the Barisan Nasional coalition, and Parti Bersatu Sabah (PBS).

During the Sabah state election held on 26 September, the GRS alliance won a simple majority in the Sabah State Legislative Assembly, winning a total of 38 seats: 17 for Perikatan Nasional, 14 for Barisan Nasional, and seven for PBS. Sabah Perikatan Nasional chairman Hajiji Noor became the new Chief Minister of Sabah on 29 September. The GRS alliance party is the biggest political coalition in the state of Sabah after won the 2020 Sabah state election.

After the GRS Party won the election, many projects that had been stopped by the previous Sabah government were restarted by the GRS Party government. The project includes the Sabah Pan-Borneo Highway.

Memorandum of understanding 

On 9 January 2021, the various leaders of the GRS component parties signed a memorandum of understanding to facilitate cooperation among its members and to reject any form of external interference that would disrupt the coalition. Signatories included Chief Minister Hajiji, Deputy Chief Minister and Sabah Barisan Nasional chairman Bung Moktar Radin, Sabah Progressive Party (SAPP) president Yong Teck Lee, Homeland Solidarity Party deputy president Ellron Alfred Angin, Parti Bersatu Sabah deputy president Datuk Seri Radin Malleh, Parti Bersatu Rakyat Sabah (PBRS) deputy president Arthur Joseph Kurup, Sabah Malaysian Indian Congress (MIC) chairman Peer Muhamad and Sabah Malaysian Chinese Association chairman Lu Yen Tung. In the occasion Sabah CM claimed that GRS should not be influenced by political events in Peninsular Malaysia.

Development planning in Sabah

In January 2021, Sabah state government under GRS Alliance initiated a strategic 5-year plan which was named after the state slogan, "Sabah Maju Jaya" (English: Sabah is prospering). It emphasised harmony with the federal government's Shared Prosperity Vision 2030.

On 21 March 2021, Federal Government of Perikatan Nasional has confirmed to fully backs Gabungan Rakyat Sabah (GRS) to lead the state (with alliance autonomy given) and will give due attention to its development needs. Tan Sri Muhyiddin Yassin said this support and relation fostered between both the state and federal governments allowed the Sabah Government to function to its best ability.

Proposal to be registered as an official political party 

On 24 November 2021, Datuk Salleh Said Keruak, the Club Backbenchers Chairperson of Gabungan Rakyat Sabah (GRS), express to registered & formalised the coalition under Societies Act 1966 in Registrar of Societies (ROS), to stabilise the Sabah government political views.

On 25 November 2021, most of all GRS leaders agreed with Datuk Salleh Said Keruak statement to formalised and registered this coalition as "political coalition party". The leaders that agreed include Datuk Jeffrey Kitingan (STAR), Datuk Masidi Manjun (PPBM), Datuk Yong Teck Lee (SAPP), Datuk Bung Mokhtar Radin (UMNO), and other parties president as well.

On 26 November 2021, Sabah State Assemblyman for Kiulu division, Datuk Joniston Bangkuai stated that all PBS leadership agreed and wanted the coalition not only formalized but registered as a legitimate coalition entity of political parties in Sabah to avoid clashes and strengthen the political views of the Sabah People's Coalition (Gabungan Rakyat Sabah) supporters.

Peter Anthony's resignation from the Warisan Party 

On 28 December 2021, Heritage Party (Warisan) vice-president Peter Anthony announced his resignation from Warisan, along with Limbahau assemblyman Juil Nuatim. A new party, which was later named Parti Kesejahteraan Demokratik Masyarakat (KDM), was founded and chaired by Peter Anthony, with Juil Nuatim being his pro-tem deputy. The party would be friendly to the ruling GRS coalition, that it will apply to be part of GRS once its registration has completed. However, GRS Information Chief and PBS Secretary-general Joniston Bangkuai has instead called for GRS component parties to strengthen existing ties between the founding parties first before admitting new members. He added that although GRS welcomes support from all Sabahans, "we (GRS) must not rush to form new alliances with parties whose loyalty and true partnership have yet to be proven."

Registered as an official political party 
The GRS party registration letter was sent on 26 February 2022 and confirmed by Datuk Seri Panglima Haji Hajiji Noor on his press statement to BERNAMA reporters.

This political party was legalised as an official single entity coalition party on 11 March 2022 and approved by Registrar of Societies (RoS).

On 18 March 2022, Datuk Seri Panglima Haji Hajiji Noor, the first chairman of GRS Party said the GRS was officially registered without BN, Gerakan, and PAS.

The GRS Party first chairman, Datuk Seri Panglima Haji Hajiji Noor also added in his speech that BN became GRS partners in the state government, just like PAS and Gerakan through capacity as a component of the PN.

On 25 September 2022, GRS Party Chairman Hajiji Noor said GRS will continue to support Barisan Nasional (BN) candidates in the upcoming 15th general election, contrary to Perikatan Nasional (PN) which has declared BN as its main enemy.

Receipt of GRS Registration Approval Certificate 

The GRS registration approval certificate was received by Datuk Seri Panglima Haji Hajiji Noor on 11 March 2022, and confirmed by him on 15 March 2022 during the inauguration of the Sabah KDM Party.

USNO becomes newest member of the Gabungan Rakyat Sabah Party 

On 9 May 2022, The United Sabah National Organisation (USNO) has been accepted as a new component party of the Gabungan Rakyat Sabah coalition party.

The fall of Sabah BERSATU party

Parti Pribumi Bersatu Malaysia (Bersatu) Sabah is now "paralyzed" when all its representatives act to leave the party effectively on 10 December 2022. The chairman of Gabungan Rakyat Sabah (GRS), Datuk Seri Hajiji Noor also stated that all the representatives of the Sabah assemblymen decided to quit and leave Sabah BERSATU party. The leaders of Parti Pribumi Bersatu Malaysia (BERSATU) Sabah including all its representatives officially announced their exit from the BERSATU party at noon on 10 December 2022. Hajiji Noor and the GRS Leadership announced to inaugurate the Gabungan Rakyat Sabah (GRS) as a local coalition in Sabah in total without the involvement of parties outside Sabah. Immediately after the exit of BERSATU Sabah from the Gabungan Rakyat Sabah (GRS), there were rumors that former members of BERSATU Sabah would join the Parti Gagasan Rakyat Sabah (PGRS), but the current President of PGRS, Stephen Jacob Jimbangan, has not received a call from the highest leadership of former BERSATU members. Stephen Jacob Jimbangan said that the ex-BERSATU Sabah to join PGRS can be misunderstanding and at the same time he did not rule out the possibility that PGRS will become a new platform for former members of BERSATU Sabah party. He also said that it would not be a problem if PGRS was made their new component and platform if it was for the good of the people of Sabah and even the top leadership of PGRS also agreed.

Become a fully integrated local political coalition party

In 2022, this coalition officially only combines the former components of Gabungan Bersatu Sabah (GBS), United Borneo Alliance (UBA), and former independent politicians. Such things cause GRS to be seen as a fully local political coalition party entity without the interference of parties outside Sabah. Gabungan Rakyat Sabah, the leading partner in the ruling state coalition, is in a stronger position following the exit of Sabah Bersatu leaders from their former party as GRS can now claim to be a fully-local Sabah party, according to political analyst Lee Kuok Tiung. He said the decision by state assemblymen and MPs of Sabah Bersatu to leave the party was a shrewd move as no one could now accuse GRS of being a Bersatu-led party masquerading as a local Sabah party. “It is now a local party and not only that, I believe it would help strengthen the Borneo Bloc with its collaboration with the Gabungan Parti Sarawak,” he said. Lee also dismissed the speculation that Hajiji Noor's government would collapse for supposedly having lost his majority in the state assembly. Instead, he said, Hajiji's position had been further fortified because he and other Bersatu Sabah members had become GRS members.

Hajiji takes over leadership of Parti Gagasan Rakyat Sabah
On 29 January 2023, Sabah Chief Minister Datuk Seri Hajiji Noor has announced his leadership of an existing local party Parti Gagasan Rakyat Sabah (Gagasan Rakyat). Hajiji announced that Gagasan Rakyat has been accepted to be part of GRS on December 9, 2022. Hajiji replaced Stephen Jacob Jimbangan as party president.

Member of Parliament for Papar, Armizan Mohd. Ali said four former BERSATU Sabah member of Parliament will not join Parti Gagasan Rakyat Sabah because anti-hopping law. Instead, they will remain as direct members of Gabungan Rakyat Sabah (GRS).

Parties structure 
 After the approval of the GRS Party registration, there were several parties who wanted to cooperate and join the party.
 USNO is the first local political party officially approved by the existing leadership of the GRS Party to join the coalition party.
 This coalition is also registered with constitution that allow Independent politician to join directly without component party and become GRS direct members.

Parliament seats (Sabah)

State seats (Sabah)

Former member parties 

 Malaysian United Indigenous Party of Sabah (BERSATU Sabah), (2020–2022) (resigned under Hajiji Noor) (rejoined PN under Ronald Kiandee on December 11, 2022)

Leadership structure

GRS Leadership official structure

 Chairman:
 Hajiji Noor (GAGASAN)
 Deputy Chairman:
 Maximus Johnity Ongkili (PBS)
 Jeffrey Gapari@Geoffrey Kitingan (STAR)
 Yong Teck Lee (SAPP)
 Pandikar Amin Mulia (USNO)
 Secretary-General:
 Masidi Manjun (GAGASAN)
 Assistant Secretary-General:
 Ardino Diris (STAR)
 Information Chief:
 Joniston Bangkuai (PBS)
 Executive Secretary:
 Abdul Kassim Jali @ Razali (GAGASAN)
 Committee Members:
 Masidi Manjun (GAGASAN)
 Mohd. Arifin Mohd. Arif (GAGASAN)
 Ruddy Awah (GAGASAN)
 Radin Malleh (PBS)
 Jahid Jahim (PBS)
 Ellron Alfred Angin (STAR)
 Edward Dagul (SAPP)

Elected representatives

Dewan Negara (Senate)

Senators 

 His Majesty's appointee:
 John Ambrose Dumpangol (GAGASAN)
 Sabah State Legislative Assembly:
 Bobbey Ah Fang Suan (GAGASAN)

Dewan Rakyat (House of Representatives)

Members of Parliament of the 15th Malaysian Parliament 

Gabungan Rakyat Sabah Party has 6 MPs in the House of Representatives.

Dewan Undangan Negeri (State Legislative Assembly)

Malaysian State Assembly Representatives 

Sabah State Legislative Assembly

General election results

State election results

GRS Party state governments

Ministerial posts

Certificate of approval

See also
 GRS direct members

Notes and references
1.a registered political party that was approved in 11 March 2022

Political party alliances in Malaysia
2020 establishments in Malaysia
Political parties established in 2020